Cornelia "Neli" Ulrich (born 31 October 1967 in Stuttgart-Bad Cannstatt, Germany) is executive director of the Comprehensive Cancer Center at Huntsman Cancer Institute (HCI), Jon M. and Karen Huntsman Presidential Professor in Cancer Research, and former Division Chief of Cancer Population Sciences in the Department of Population Health Sciences at the University of Utah. Ulrich oversees HCI's academic consortium of nearly 200 cancer research teams. She leads efforts to advance the impact of HCI's research in laboratory, clinical and population science, with the goal of improving cancer prevention and treatment. Prior to joining HCI, she was the director and department head of preventive oncology at the National Center of Tumor Diseases (NCT) and German Cancer Research Center (DKFZ) in Heidelberg. During this time, she also held a Professorship at the DKFZ and University of Heidelberg. From 1993 until 2009, Ulrich was a Member of the Fred Hutchinson Cancer Research Center and Professor in Epidemiology at the University of Washington in Seattle.

Ulrich has published more than 350 publications (h-Index 68). Ulrich is a former Fulbright Scholar, DAAD Scholar, and an elected member to the European Academy of Cancer Sciences; she serves on numerous national and international advisory boards, committees, and editorial boards including several of the National Institutes of Health, National Academy of Sciences, Engineering and Medicine, International Agency for Research on Cancer (IARC) and American Association for Cancer Research (AACR), and was chair of the Scientific Council of IARC until May 2015. Her research group focuses on lifestyle and biologic factors in cancer prevention and cancer prognosis, particularly colorectal cancer. Key topics include the usage of inflammation inhibitors (e.g., aspirin) in cancer prevention and prognosis. to prevent cancer, personalized medicine by using pharmacogenetics, and the role of energy balance and physical activity. Ulrich is also Principal Investigator of the HCI Total Cancer Care Protocol in the ORIEN network of cancer centers.

Life and education 
Ulrich graduated in 1987 from the Gustav-Stresemann-Gymnasium in Fellbach, Germany and studied Nutritional Sciences at the University of Hohenheim and the Oregon State University. She completed her master's degree in 1992 at Oregon State University. In 1998 she completed her PhD in epidemiology at the University of Washington and the Fred Hutchinson Cancer Research Center. She is married and mother of two sons.

1987	Abitur Gustav-Stresemann-Gymnasium, Fellbach-Schmiden, Germany
1990	Vordiplom (comparable to bachelor's degree) University of Hohenheim, Germany, Major: Nutrition Science
1992	Master of Science (Nutrition; Minor: Public Health) Oregon State University, Corvallis
Master's Thesis: "Relationship between total, axial, and peripheral bone mineral density, lifetime milk consumption, and lifetime physical activity, in elderly mothers and their premenopausal daughters."(Mentor: Constance Georgiou)
1998	Ph.D. (Epidemiology) also: Certificate, Doctoral Studies Program (Health Services Research) University of Washington, Seattle
Dissertation: "Common polymorphisms in metabolizing enzymes – some implications for colon cancer etiology, prevention, and genetic testing." (Mentors: John D. Potter, Stephen Schwartz)

Honors and awards 
 1991/92: Fulbright Scholarship and Fulbright Professional Enhancement Grant
 1992: Jewell-Fields-Rohlfing graduate scholarship, Oregon State University 
 1993–95: DAAD Stipendium, für PhD-Studien in Epidemiologie
 1998: Outstanding Student Award, Department of Epidemiology, University of Washington
 1998: American Association for Cancer Research Bristol-Myers Squibb Young Investigator Awardhttps://sharedresources.fredhutch.org/profile/ulrich-cornelia
 2009: Exzellenzprofessur, Deutsches Krebsforschungszentrum (DKFZ)
 2011: Forschungs- und Entwicklungspreis 2011, Krebsverband Baden-Württemberg e.V.
 2013: Felix Burda Award 2013, "Best Prevention Idea", Felix Burda Stiftung, Berlin
 2014: Short-List Felix Burda Award 2014, "Wissenschaft und Science", Felix Burda Stiftung, Berlin
 2014: Jon and Karen Huntsman Presidential Professor in Cancer Research
 2018: National Academy of Medicine Annual Meeting Presentation
 2019: Executive Leadership in Academic Medicine (ELAM) Program
 2021: Distinguished Research Award, University of Utah

References

External links 
  Cornelia Ulrich in AcademiaNet, a database of scientists in Germany
  Cornelia Ulrich at Huntsman Cancer Institute
  DKFZ Executive Women's Initiative

1967 births
Living people
Oregon State University alumni
University of Washington faculty
University of Utah faculty
Cancer researchers
German epidemiologists
American women epidemiologists
American epidemiologists
21st-century American women
Fred Hutchinson Cancer Research Center people
Fulbright alumni